D101 is a state road connecting D100 state road to Merag ferry port, from where Jadrolinija ferries fly to Valbiska, Krk and D104 state road. The road is 10.9 km long.

The road, as well as all other state roads in Croatia, is managed and maintained by Hrvatske ceste, a state-owned company.

Traffic volume 

D101 traffic is not counted directly, however the operator Hrvatske ceste reports the number of vehicles using ferry service flying from Merag port, accessed by the D101 road, thereby allowing the D101 traffic volume to be deduced. Substantial variations between annual (AADT) and summer (ASDT) traffic volumes are attributed to the fact that the road serves as a connection carrying substantial tourist traffic to the Krk Island.

Road junctions and populated areas

Sources

See also
 Hrvatske ceste
 Jadrolinija

State roads in Croatia
Transport in Primorje-Gorski Kotar County